The 2018 Bangkok Challenger was a professional tennis tournament played on hard courts. It was the tenth edition of the tournament and was part of the 2018 ATP Challenger Tour. It took place in Bangkok, Thailand between 1 and 7 January 2018.

Singles main-draw entrants

Seeds

 1 Rankings are as of 25 December 2017.

Other entrants
The following players received wildcards into the singles main draw:
  Pruchya Isaro
  Patcharapol Kawin
  Vorachon Rakpuangchon
  Wishaya Trongcharoenchaikul

The following players received entry from the qualifying draw:
  Flavio Cipolla
  Evgeny Karlovskiy
  Dominik Köpfer
  Mats Moraing

Champions

Singles

 Marcel Granollers def.  Mats Moraing 4–6, 6–3, 7–5.

Doubles

 Gerard Granollers /  Marcel Granollers def.  Zdeněk Kolář /  Gonçalo Oliveira 6–3, 7–6(8–6).

References

 
 ATP Challenger Tour
Tennis, ATP Challenger Tour, Bangkok Challenger
Tennis, ATP Challenger Tour, Bangkok Challenger

Tennis, ATP Challenger Tour, Bangkok Challenger